David DeFries (born 24 May 1952) is an English jazz trumpeter, flugelhornist, percussionist, composer and arranger, who was born in London, England. He was a member of Chris McGregor's Brotherhood of Breath from 1981 onwards, and continues in both the London, and South African Brotherhoods that perform McGregor's repertoire.

He was also a member of the Penguin Cafe Orchestra, Loose Tubes, and the Breakfast Band, which occasionally recorded sessions for BBC Radio Two's "Night Owls", hosted by Dave Gelly. His one solo album, 1988's The Secret City, is on the same axis as Don Cherry and the Art Ensemble of Chicago, jazz meeting world music, with Harry Beckett on second trumpet on one of the tracks. His earlier work includes providing a trumpet backing to Chris Farlowe on Farlowe's album, Born Again (1986).

References

1952 births
Living people
English jazz trumpeters
Male trumpeters
Jazz flugelhornists
British session musicians
21st-century trumpeters
21st-century British male musicians
British male jazz musicians
Loose Tubes members
Penguin Cafe Orchestra members
Rip Rig + Panic members